Roberto Mandje (born March 7, 1982) is an Equatoguinean Olympic middle-distance and long-distance runner. He represented his country in the men's 1500 meters at the 2004 Summer Olympics, the 2011 IAAF World Cross Country Championships, and the 2012 and 2013 XTERRA World Trail Racing Championships, where he placed seventh and fifth, respectively.

In the 2004 Athens Games, Mandje was tripped early in his first-round heat, which also included world record-holder Hicham El Guerrouj of Morocco, the eventual Olympic champion. He finished the race, despite injuring an ankle, in a time of 4:03.37. The injury forced him to withdraw from the 3000-metre steeplechase, for which he had also qualified.

In 2012 and 2013, Mandje was among the world's best trail racers. Besides his XTERRA World Trail Racing Championships performances, in 2013 he won the Lake Las Vegas 21K and the Cheyenne Mountain Trail Run 12K and finished second at the Oak Mountain Trail Run 20K and the Beaver Creek Trail Run 10K.

At the 2011 IAAF World Cross Country Championships in Punta Umbria, ESP, Mandje finished 109th in a time of 41:54 for the 12,000m distance.

Personal bests:

1500m — 4:00.33 (Ninove, BEL), 11 AUG 2007

3000m SC — 9:04.54 (Los Angeles, CA, USA), 7 JUN 2008

References

1982 births
Living people
Equatoguinean male middle-distance runners
Olympic athletes of Equatorial Guinea
Athletes (track and field) at the 2004 Summer Olympics